Cirrus spissatus or also called Cirrus densus and Cirrus nothus  clouds are the highest of the main cloud genera, and may sometimes even occur in the lower stratosphere. The characteristic features of cirrus clouds are fine threads or wisps of ice crystals, generally white, but appearing grey when dense and seen against the light. There is no precipitation at the ground. It also frequently exhibits optical phenomena.

Cirrus spissatus is the dense cirrus that will partly or completely hide the sun (or moon) and which appears dark grey when seen against the light. Although it arises under various circumstances, it is particularly commonly found in the plumes or anvils of cumulonimbus clouds.

Precipitation is likely within 15 to 25 hours if winds are steady from NE E to S, or sooner if winds SE to S. Other winds bring an overcast sky.

A different variety of cirrus spissatus also forms from phenomena that have nothing to do with cumulonimbus blow-off or dissipating cumulonimbus cells.  When dense cirrus is formed by means other than by cumulonimbus blow-off or dissipating cumulonimbus clouds, it will frequently be seen as many dense patches at different levels (cirrus spissatus duplicatus), often mixed with thin cirrus filaments.  Another variety, cirrus spissatus intortus, is sometimes described as looking like "entangled sheaves" of cirrus clouds. When viewed toward the sun, the denser patches often have gray bases.

See also
 List of cloud types

References

Sources
 
 http://www.clouds-online.com/cloud_atlas/cirrus/cirrus.htm
 https://web.archive.org/web/20110605020117/http://www.tpub.com/content/aerographer/14269/css/14269_34.htm
 http://en.wiktionary.org/wiki/spissus#Latin

Cirrus